Ivan Koljević (born 30 June 1984) is a Montenegrin professional basketball player. He is 1.86 m (6 ft 1 in) tall point guard. 

In January 2014, he signed with Esteghlal Zarin Qeshm of the Iranian Basketball Super League.

References

External links
 Adriatic League Profile 
 ACB.com Profile 
 Eurobasket.com Profile
 Euroleague.net Profile
 TBLStat.net Profile

1984 births
Living people
ABA League players
BC Cherkaski Mavpy players
BC Khimik players
BC Rytas players
BC Odesa players
Bilbao Basket players
Bornova Belediye players
KK Budućnost players
KK Lovćen players
Liga ACB players
Montenegrin men's basketball players
Montenegrin expatriate basketball people in Spain
Olympiacos B.C. players
PBC Ural Great players
Sportspeople from Cetinje
Point guards
Trikala B.C. players
Turów Zgorzelec players